GD Matriculation Higher Secondary School is a school in Gopala Puram, Coimbatore, Tamil Nadu, India. The founder of the school was renowned scientist Mr.G.D.Naidu whose museum is a fascination to many physicists, automobile engineers and agriculturists.  The medium of instruction in the school is 'English'. The school starts its operations pretty early as compared to other schools in the city. The school starts at 7AM IST and institutionalizes 'Yoga' as a norm to all students. 
GD School also houses extracurricular activities like Flute, Vocal Music, Mridangam, Classical dance, carpentry and so on. Apart from extracurricular activities, the school also focuses on survival skills like cookery, personality development and good grooming.

The school is currently run by his daughter-in-law Mrs. Chandra Gopal who is the correspondent. The principal of the school is Ms. Vimala Vijayan.

References

External links
Official site

High schools and secondary schools in Tamil Nadu
Schools in Coimbatore
Educational institutions established in 1982
1982 establishments in Tamil Nadu